Tarang, also known as O'Keefe's Island is a small island in the main harbor of Yap Island in the Federated States of Micronesia. It is located roughly in the center of the harbor east of Colonia, the Yapese capital, between Pekel and Bi Islands. The island has local historical importance as the home of Captain David O'Keefe, an enterprising American who arrived on Yap in the 1870s, and was responsible for not only significant economic growth, but also for the depreciation of the distinctive Yapese currency, the large rai stones which became devalued after O'Keefe introduced iron tools that made manufacture of the stones easier. O'Keefe settled on Tarang, where he had a boat landing, coal warehouse, and house. Of these structures, only the boat landing has survived; only foundations survive of the others.

The island was listed on the United States National Register of Historic Places in 1976, a time when Yap was part of the US-administered Trust Territory of the Pacific Islands.

References

Islands of Yap
Archaeological sites on the National Register of Historic Places in the Federated States of Micronesia